Wahengbam Nipamacha Singh (17 December 1930 – 17 July 2012) was chief Minister of the northeastern India state of Manipur. Nipamacha Singh became chief minister replacing Rishang Keishing from the Congress in 1997.

In 1997, he started the Manipur State Congress Party (MSCP) while he was the Speaker in the same year. Though he won the 2000 election for the second time, he was removed the very next year when President's rule was declared in the state. Saying, "It is a sin to be with a party that does not have any representation in Parliament. However powerful the party might be on home turf, it cannot raise Manipur’s problems in Parliament if it does not have any MP", he left the party.  He formed the Manipur National Conference (MNC) in 2002. He lost his seat in the 2002 Assembly election.

In 2008, Singh joined the Bharatiya Janata Party (BJP),  from Rashtriya Janata Dal.  The MSCP later merged with the Congress in 2014. Before 2008, he was president of the RJD's Manipur unit.

References

2012 deaths
1930 births
Chief Ministers of Manipur
Manipur politicians
Indian National Congress politicians
Rashtriya Janata Dal politicians
Bharatiya Janata Party politicians from Manipur
Manipur MLAs 1995–2000
Manipur MLAs 2000–2002